Jowitt is a surname. Notable people with the surname include:

Cameron Jowitt (born 1983), Samoan/New Zealand Rugby Union footballer
Claire Jowitt, English academic who writes on race, cross-gender, piracy, identity, empire and performance
Deborah Jowitt, American dance critic, author, and choreographer
Edwin Jowitt, (born 1929), British former High Court judge
Glenn Jowitt (1955–2014), New Zealand photographer who specialized in the people and cultures of the Pacific Islands
John Jowitt, bass guitarist known for his work with several UK progressive bands, such as Ark, IQ, Arena, Jadis and Frost
Ken Jowitt, American political scientist
Paul Jowitt CBE, Professor of Civil Engineering Systems at Heriot Watt University, executive director of the Scottish Institute of Sustainable Technology
Robin Jowitt, rugby league footballer who played in the 2000s
Warren Jowitt (born 1974) rugby league footballer who played in the 1990s and 2000s
William Jowitt, 1st Earl Jowitt PC, KC (1885–1957), British Labour politician, lawyer, Lord High Chancellor of Great Britain from 1945 to 1951, author of Jowitt's Dictionary of English Law

See also
Joe Witte
John Witt